The canton of Hochfelden is a former canton of France, located in the Bas-Rhin department, in the Alsace region. It had 16,918 inhabitants (2012). It was disbanded following the French canton reorganisation which came into effect in March 2015. It consisted of 29 communes.

Communes
The communes of the canton of Hochfelden were:

Alteckendorf
Bossendorf
Duntzenheim
Ettendorf
Friedolsheim
Geiswiller
Gingsheim
Grassendorf
Hochfelden
Hohatzenheim
Hohfrankenheim
Ingenheim
Issenhausen
Lixhausen
Melsheim
Minversheim
Mittelhausen
Mutzenhouse
Ringeldorf
Ringendorf
Saessolsheim
Schaffhouse-sur-Zorn
Scherlenheim
Schwindratzheim
Waltenheim-sur-Zorn
Wickersheim-Wilshausen
Wilwisheim
Wingersheim
Zœbersdorf

See also 
 Cantons of the Bas-Rhin department

References

Hochfelden
2015 disestablishments in France
States and territories disestablished in 2015